Mats Ingemar Lindh (born 12 September 1947) is a Swedish retired professional ice hockey player. He played 138 games in the World Hockey Association with the Winnipeg Jets during the 1975–76 and 1976–77 seasons, scoring 33 goals and 32 assists.

He competed as a member of the Sweden men's national ice hockey team at the 1972 Winter Olympics held in Japan.

References

External links

1947 births
Living people
Frölunda HC players
Swedish ice hockey centres
Winnipeg Jets (WHA) players
Olympic ice hockey players of Sweden
Ice hockey players at the 1972 Winter Olympics